Osoj is a village in the municipality of Kičevo, North Macedonia.

Demographics
According to the 2002 census, the village had a total of 593 inhabitants. Ethnic groups in the village include:

Macedonians – 397
Romani – 169
Albanians – 67
Serbs – 2 
Others – 28

References

External links

Villages in Kičevo Municipality
Albanian communities in North Macedonia